The Tipperary Senior Football Championship is an annual Gaelic Athletic Association club competition between the top Gaelic football clubs in Tipperary. The winners of the Tipperary Championship qualify to represent their county in the Munster Senior Club Football Championship, the winners of which advance to the All-Ireland Senior Club Football Championship.

History
Over the decades, the Tipperary championship has been dominated by teams from South Tipperary, with Fethard and Clonmel Commercials leading the roll of honour, though Loughmore-Castleiney from Mid Tipperary strongly challenge and were the 2014 champions. Kilruane MacDonagh's were North Tipperary's last club team to be victorious in 1975, while teams from West Tipperary have also figured in the honours list, including Aherlow who won their first championship in 2006. Other teams from the West to have won the championship include Galtee Rovers and Arravale Rovers, champions in 1985. The latter were promoted from Intermediate level for 2008, thus providing Tipperary Town with a senior team once again. Clonmel, a town a population of about 20,000 people, now has three senior clubs, Commercials, with Moyle Rovers located in the outer suburban fringe. A more recently formed club, Clonmel Óg, first contested the senior championships in 2009, having won the Intermediate Championship in 2008.

Over the years, prominent senior football clubs have included Fethard, Clonmel Commercials, Moyle Rovers, Ardfinnan, Grangemockler, Kilsheelan and Cahir from South Tipperary. Western teams who are consistent participants in the championship include Aherlow, Arravale Rovers, Eire Og, Anacarty and Galtee Rovers. Loughmore-Castleiney and J.K. Bracken's have the most wins in the division with Moyne-Templetuohy following closely behind.
The champions in 2005 were Ardfinnan who made a winning return to the roll of honour after an absence of 31 years, while 2006 saw divisional champions, Aherlow, lift the West Tipperary trophy for the first time.

In 2007, Moyle Rovers triumphed once again. The 2008 final saw Galtee Rovers defeat Cahir to bring the title back to Bansha after an absence of 27 years, but their reign was short-lived and Moyle Rovers restored the South's supremacy in 2009 with their win over West champions, Aherlow on 25 October at Semple Stadium. However, Aherlow came back for victory in 2010, taking the laurels from Loughmore-Castleiney in the final. The 2011 championship was unique in that for the first time, it was won by Thomas MacDonagh's, a combination team representing nine clubs in the North Tipperary Division. They won the title from Moyle Rovers in the final in Cashel on 6 November 2011. It was the first time in 36 years that the title went North, the last victorious team from the region being Kilruane MacDonagh's in 1975. However, MacDonagh's relinquished their title in 2012 when Clonmel Commercials returned as champions for the 15th time, thus bridging a 10-year gap since their last victory.

2013 saw the Loughmore-Castleiney club win the Senior Football Championship for the 12th time and also won the Senior Hurling Championship - thus becoming the first club to win both championships in the same year. Loughmore-Castleiney's victory came at Semple Stadium on Sunday, 3 November, when their three-goal tally saw off the challenge of Aherlow Gaels which is a combination team representing the Aherlow and Lattin-Cullen clubs in West Tipperary. The 2014 county championship was decided on St. Stephens Day following a replayed county final when the Loughmore-Casteleiny club successfully defended their title against a Cahir team on a score of 0–9 to 2–2.

In 2015, Clonmel Commercials won the Tipperary title for the 16th time before advancing to win a coveted Munster title, the first for the county. Their journey continued to the All-Ireland Final where they were defeated by Ballyboden St. Enda's of Dublin.

Top winners

Finals

North Tipperary
While there is currently no senior divisional championship, an occasional presence is maintained in the county championship by one or two teams, often representing an amalgamation of junior clubs who play in the divisional junior championship. The senior football championship began in the north in 1908 but it only became competitive/organised in the 1960's. For many years there might only be one team in the north who would go on to represent the division without having played any matches. On other occasions north teams would ply their trade in the other divisions. Past teams have included two-time winners Nenagh, Inane Rovers from Roscrea, St Flannan's and Kilruane MacDonagh's, the latter two having won the county championship on one occasion each. The region received a boost in 2011 when a combination team which drew players from nine clubs, Thomas MacDonagh's GFC, won the County Championship; a feat last achieved in 1975, when the other MacDonagh's from Kilruane were champions.

Mid Tipperary
The Mid Tipperary Senior Football Championship is generally contested by three teams: J.K. Bracken's of Templemore, Loughmore-Castleiney and Moyne-Templetuohy. The following is a list of winners of the Mid Tipperary Championship.

West Tipperary
The West Tipperary Championship has been contested by the same four teams in recent years: Aherlow Gaels (Aherlow & Lattin/Cullen), Éire Óg Annacarty, Galtee Rovers and Arravale Rovers with Galtee Rovers winning their 26th title in 2018 to consolidate their place at the top of the roll of honour which they have maintained since their inaugural win in the championship of 1947. Since 2008, the championship has been a round-robin affair with the top teams qualifying for the final. In some years, the emerging champions also advanced to the quarter final of the County Championship. The stranglehold on the championship enjoyed by the Aherlow/Galtee Rovers axis was broken in 2011 and new champions other than these two clubs were crowned for the first time since Knockavilla Kickhams took the laurels in 1998. The 2011 final contestants were Arravale Rovers of Tipperary Town and Éire Óg, Annacarty. However, it was Arravale's turn once again to take the laurels after 18 years, when they were a goal to the good in the final played at Golden on 25 September.

In 2012, Éire Óg won their inaugural championship. However, their reign was short-lived as Arravale Rovers were winners of the 2013 championship, when they saw off Galtee Rovers in one of the few finals to be played at Lattin. Galtee Rovers reached a milestone when they won their 25th title on 3 October 2014 when defeating Éire Óg Anacarty by 4–6 to 0–7 in the final played at Dundrum.

In the early years of the championship, which was inaugurated in 1940 but was not concluded that year, an Arravale Rovers team of the war years, claim to be champions of West Tipperary in 1942, a claim not disputed by the other clubs, though details are scarce on the victory records. Notwithstanding this early episode, Arravale were All-Ireland Senior Football Champions when other clubs were just starting out at the end of the 19th century. The combination team of Aherlow and Lattin-Cullen playing under the banner of Aherlow Gaels won their only championship to date when they prevailed in the 2016 final, producing a goal rush against finalists Galtee Rovers at Dundrum on 25 September 2016. The 2017 Championship saw Arravale Rovers regain the title by a three-point margin the final against Galtee Rovers in the final played in Annacarty. Galtee Rovers were champions again in 2018, defeating Eire Og, Annacarty by 2–8 to 1–7, in the final played at Cappawhite on 14 December.  The following is the list of winners of the West Tipperary Senior Football Championship since the inauguration of the championship in 1940 to 2018.

Galtee Rovers: (26) – 1947, 1949, 1950, 1951, 1952, 1953, 1954, 1962, 1963, 1974, 1975, 1976, 1979, 1983, 1985, 1989, 1991, 1999, 2000, 2001, 2002, 2003, 2004, 2008, 2014, 2018.

Arravale Rovers: (13) – 1942, 1948, 1955, 1972, 1973, 1981, 1984, 1992, 1993, 2011, 2013, 2015, 2017.

Lattin-Cullen: (10) – 1958, 1961, 1964, 1965, 1966, 1967, 1969, 1971, 1982, 1994.

Aherlow: (6) – 1997, 2005, 2006, 2007, 2009, 2010.

Solohead: (4) – 1956, 1957, 1970, 1977.

Golden-Kilfeacle: (4) – 1986, 1988, 1995, 1996.

Emly: (3) – 1959, 1960, 1987.

Cappawhite: (1) – 1978.

Cashel King Cormacs: (1) – 1990.

Knockavilla-Donaskeigh Kickhams: (1) – 1998.

St. Ailbe's ( Aherlow & Emly): (1) – 1968.

Golden-Rockwell (Golden/Kilfeacle & Rockwell Rovers): (1) – 1980.

Éire Óg Annacarty: (1) – 2012.

Aherlow Gaels (Aherlow & Lattin-Cullen): (1) – 2016

South Tipperary
The South Tipperary Championship is contested by ten teams: Ardfinnan, Cahir, Carrick Swans, Clonmel Commercials, Fethard, Clonmel Óg, Killenaule, Moyle Rovers, Kilsheelan-Kilcash and Mullinahone.

The championship is currently a two group competition. The winners of each group go directly into two semi finals, with the 2nd and 3rd placed teams playing off in two quarter finals.

References

External links
Official Tipperary Website
Tipperary on Hoganstand
Tipperary Club GAA

 
F1
Senior Gaelic football county championships
1